By-elections were held on 8 National Assembly and 3 Punjab Assembly constituencies in Pakistan on 16 October 2022 and 1 National Assembly seat on 30 October 2022. Pakistan Tehreek-e-Insaf got a landslide victory by winning 7 out of 9 National Assembly and 2 out of 3 Punjab Assembly seats seats whereas the Pakistan Democratic Movement, an alliance of 14 parties, was only able to win 2 National Assembly seats and 1 Punjab Assembly seat.

The by-elections were held on the following seats: NA-22 (Mardan-III), NA-24 (Charsadda-II), NA-31 (Peshawar-V), NA-45 (Kurram-I), NA-108 (Faisalabad-VIII), NA-118 (Nankana Sahib-II), NA-157 (Multan-IV), NA 237 (Malir-II), and NA-239 (Korangi Karachi-I).

Background 
After the removal of Prime Minister Imran Khan through a successful vote of no-confidence, 123 MNAs of Pakistan Tehreek-e-Insaf (PTI), along with Imran Khan and several former Ministers. resigned from the National Assembly of Pakistan. Although the Deputy Speaker at the time, Qasim Suri, accepted said resignations, he soon resigned from the National Assembly as well. 
elected Speaker Raja Pervaiz Ashraf summoned PTI MNAs to individually verify their resignations but no one appeared. On 29 July 2022, 11 of these resignations were accepted. Nine of these 11 were general seats whose members were directly elected and a further seven of these nine were for constituencies where the PTI candidate's margin of victory was extremely slim. Abdul Shakoor Shad, the MNA from NA-246 (Karachi South-I), went to the Islamabad high Court and had his resignation suspended.

The PTI MNA from NA-157 (Multan-IV), Zain Hussain Qureshi, also resigned with the rest of his party, but his resignation was not accepted. However, he ceased to be an MNA when he took oath as a member of the Provincial Assembly of Punjab on 18 July 2022.

One seat, NA-45 (Kurram-I), was also vacated, but the by-election for it was postponed till 30 October due to the deterioration of the law and order situation in the constituency.

Therefore, by-elections for 8 National Assembly constituencies were scheduled by the Election Commission of Pakistan for 16 October 2022, whereas the by-election for NA-45 was held on 30 October 2022.

Candidates 
According to Election Commission of Pakistan 90 candidates ran for 8 National Assembly and 3 Punjab Assembly seats. Registered voters in these 11 Constituencies were 4,506,124 out of which 2,467,856 were male and 2,038,268 were female. 2,937 polling stations were created in these constituencies out of which 1416 were combined polling stations, 807 for males and remaining 714 for female. 747 polling station were considered high sensitive and 694 were considered sensitive for security reasons. 9,869 polling booths were created: 5,294 male and 4,575 female.

Results

National Assembly 

† JUI (F) and JI previously contested jointly as MMA.

Punjab Assembly

Result by Constituency (National Assembly)

Khyber Pakhtunkhwa

NA-22 (Mardan-III) 
After the resignation of Ali Muhammad Khan, the previous PTI MNA, this seat became vacant. Imran Khan, the chairman of the Pakistan Tehreek-e-Insaf (PTI), emerged victorious with 50.01% of the vote against Maulana Muhammad Qasim of the Jamiat Ulema-e-Islam (F) (JUI (F)), who was supported by the Pakistan Democratic Movement (PDM), and Abdul Wasi of the Jamaat-e-Islami Pakistan (JI).

NA-24 (Charsadda-II) 
After the resignation of Fazal Muhammad Khan, the previous PTI MNA, this seat became vacant. Imran Khan, the chairman of the PTI, emerged victorious with 50.64% of the vote with 50.64% of the vote against Aimal Wali Khan of the Awami National Party (ANP), who was supported by the PDM, and Mujeeb-ur-Rehman of the JI.

NA-31 (Peshawar-V) 
After the resignation of Shokat Ali, the previous PTI MNA, this seat became vacant. Imran Khan, the chairman of the PTI, emerged victorious with 61.14% of the vote against Ghulam Ahmad Bilour of the ANP, who was supported by the PDM, and Muhammad Aslam of the JI.

NA-45 (Kurram-I) 
After resignation of Fakhar Zaman Khan, the previous PTI MNA, this seat became vacant. Imran Khan, the chairman of the PTI, emerged victorious with 58.42% of votes against Jamil Khan Chamkhani of the JUI(F), who was supported by the PDM.

†JUI (F) previously contested as part of MMA

Punjab

NA 108 (Faisalabad-VIII) 
After the resignation of Farrukh Habib, the previous PTI MNA, this seat became vacant. Imran Khan, the chairman of the PTI, emerged victorious with 54.87% of the vote against Abid Sher Ali of the Pakistan Muslim League (N) (PML(N)), who was supported by the PDM.

NA-118 (Nankana Sahib-II) 
After the resignation of Ijaz Shah, the previous PTI MNA, this seat became vacant. Imran Khan, the chairman of the PTI, emerged victorious with 45.97% of the vote against Shizra Mansab Ali Khan of the PML(N), who was supported by the PDM, and Syed Afzaal Hussain Rizvi of the Tehreek-e-Labbaik Pakistan (TLP).

NA-157 (Multan-IV) 
After the resignation of Zain Qureshi, the previous PTI MNA, this seat became vacant. Ali Musa Gillani of the Pakistan People's Party (PPP), who was supported by the PDM, emerged victorious with 53.11% of the vote against Meher Bano Qureshi of the PTI. Gillani is the son of Yousaf Raza Gillani, the former Prime Minister and PPP's leader in the Senate, while Qureshi is the daughter of Shah Mahmood Qureshi, the former Minister of Foreign Affairs and vice chairman of the PTI.

Sindh

NA 237 (Malir Karachi-II) 
After the resignation of Jamil Ahmed Khan, the previous PTI MNA, this seat became vacant. Abdul Hakeem Baloch of the PPP, who was supported by the PDM, emerged victorious with 55.14% of the vote against Imran Khan, the chairman of the PTI.

NA-239 (Korangi Karachi-I) 
After the resignation of Akram Cheema, the previous PTI MNA, this seat became vacant. Imran Khan, the chairman of the PTI, emerged victorious with 58.22% of the vote against Syed Nayyar Raza of the Muttahida Qaumi Movement – Pakistan (MQM-P).

Result by Constituency (Punjab Assembly)

PP-139 (Sheikhupura-V) 
After the resignation of Mian Jaleel Ahmed, the previous PML(N) MPA, this seat became vacant. Chaudhry Iftikhar Ahmad Bhangoo of the PML(N), who was supported by the PDM, emerged victorious with 43.30% of the vote against Muhammad Abu Bakar of the PTI.

PP-209 (Khanewal-VII) 
After the resignation of Faisal Khan Niazi, the previous PML(N) MPA, this seat became vacant. Niazi ran for reelection as a PTI candidate and emerged victorious with 52.27% of the vote against Chaudhry Zia-ur-Rehman of the PML(N).

PP-241 (Bahawalnagar-V) 
After the disqualification of Kashif Mahmood, the previous PML(N) MPA, this seat became vacant. Malik Muzaffar Khan of the PTI emerged victorious with 52.42% of the vote against Amanullah Sattar of the PML(N).

See also 
 2022 Punjab by elections
 2023 Pakistan by-elections

References 

2022 in Pakistani politics
2022 elections in Pakistan
October 2022 events in Pakistan